Amicitia (minor planet designation: 367 Amicitia) is a typical Main belt asteroid that is a member of the Flora family. It was discovered by Auguste Charlois on 19 May 1893 in Nice.

Amicitia is Latin for Friendship.

References

External links
 
 

Background asteroids
Amicitia
18930519
Amicitia